Dong District (Dong-gu) is a district, similar to a ward, situated in the city of Gwangju, South Korea. Mt. Mudeung is a famous landmark in the district. Modern art is displayed at the Street of Art, which was the first one of its kind in South Korea. It has Asian Cultural Center and Gwangju International Community Center.

See also
Hwanggeum-dong, Gwangju

External links
Website of Dong-gu, Gwangju